Go Ballistic is the first CD release by Ipswich ska band, The Ballistics.

Track listing
This Is The UK
Too Scared To Dance
Burning Out
F++k The Vote
What Does It Take?
All My Neighbours
Go Ballistic
One More Time (live)
Easy Way Out (live)

Band members
Glenn McCarthy - vocals
Daz Hewitt - keyboards / vocals
Rich Garner - guitar
Mike Claydon - bass
Steve Pipe - drums
Martyn Peck ('Roki') - guitar

More information
The seven tracks that constitute the studio recordings were all written by The Ballistics. The live tracks are both covers. One More Time was originally recorded by The Clash. Easy Way Out was originally recorded by fellow Ipswich band, The Adicts.

References

2003 albums
The Ballistics albums